Charles Forsman (born 1982) is an American comic book author.

Combining a simple drawing style with dark and realistic themes, Forsman continues the tradition of alternative comics. He obtained a degree from the Center for Cartoon Studies in 2008.

Career 
His self-published comic Snake Oil won the 2008 Ignatz Awards for Outstanding Comic and Outstanding Series. His graphic novel The End of the F***ing World, "a modern ballad of angst and murder", won the 2013 Ignatz Award for Outstanding Minicomic and was adapted in 2017 into a British TV series of the same name which ran for two seasons.

The End of the F***ing World, I Am Not Okay with This and Celebrated Summer were published by Fantagraphics Books. All his other works, such as Revenger or Slasher, were either self-published, published by small publishers, or sold directly to online readers via Patreon.

On June 10, 2019, it was announced that Netflix would produce a seven-episode series based on I Am Not Okay with This. The series premiered on February 26, 2020. Originally renewed for a second season, but Netflix canceled the series in August 2020, citing "circumstances related to the COVID-19 pandemic".

Bibliography
 The End of the F***ing World (Fantagraphics Books, 2011–2012)
 Celebrated Summer (Fantagraphics Books, 2014)
 Revenger #1–5 (Oily Comics, 2015)
 Hobo Mom (with Max de Radiguès) (Fantagraphics Books, 2015)
 Slasher (Floating World Comics, 2017)
 I Am Not Okay With This (Fantagraphics Books, 2017)

Adaptations
 TEOTFW (short film; 2014)
 The End of the F***ing World (British television series; 2017–2019)
 I Am Not Okay with This (television series; 2020)

References

American comics artists
American comics writers
American graphic novelists
Living people
1982 births
Center for Cartoon Studies alumni